Ricardo Cristóbal Blume Traverso (16 August 1933 – 30 October 2020) was a Peruvian actor and theatre director who developed most of his career in Mexico. His work encompassed theatre, cinema and TV. He was the founding teacher of the Teatro de la Universidad Católica (TUC) at the Pontificia Universidad Católica del Perú.

Filmography

Films

Television

Awards
 Premio Bravo - Asociación Internacional de Periodistas de México
 CIRCE
 Distinción of Teatro de la Universidad Católica.
 Doctor Honoris Causa of Pontificia Universidad Católica del Perú (2006).
 Mi vida en el teatro of Centro Mexicano del Instituto Internacional de Teatro de la UNESCO.
 Medalla Juan Pablo y Vizcardo y Guzmán - Congreso of Republica of Peru (2002).

References

External links
 

1933 births
2020 deaths
People from Lima
Male actors from Lima
Peruvian emigrants to Mexico
Peruvian male stage actors
Peruvian male telenovela actors
Peruvian people of German descent
Peruvian male film actors
20th-century Peruvian male actors
21st-century Peruvian male actors